Igor Angulo Alboniga (born 26 January 1984) is a Spanish professional footballer who plays as a forward.

Formed at Athletic Bilbao, he appeared in only five competitive matches during his spell at the club. He went on to make a name for himself in the Polish Ekstraklasa, surpassing the 80-goal mark for Górnik Zabrze. He also played professionally in France, Cyprus, Greece and India. 

Angulo represented Spain at various youth international levels.

Club career

Athletic Bilbao
Born in Bilbao, Biscay, Angulo joined Athletic Bilbao's youth setup in 1996, aged 12, after starting out at Danok Bat CF. He made his debut as a senior with the farm team in 2002, in Tercera División.

Angulo made his first-team — and La Liga — debut on 23 March 2003, coming on as a late substitute in a 2–1 away loss against RC Celta de Vigo. In June, he was promoted to the reserves in Segunda División B.

On 30 December 2004, after appearing in only three league matches with the main squad, Angulo was loaned to Segunda División's Gimnàstic de Tarragona until the end of the season. After featuring regularly he returned to the Basques, and renewed his contract on 19 October 2005.

On 25 July 2006, Angulo moved abroad for the first time in his career, joining French Championnat National club AS Cannes in a season-long loan deal. Upon returning, he was again assigned to the B team.

Angulo cut ties with the Lions on 21 July 2008.

Spain
On 21 July 2008, Angulo moved to Écija Balompié in the third tier along with Athletic teammate Aitor Ramos. In his second season at the Andalusians he contributed nine goals in only 19 league matches, being the team's top scorer; highlights included a hat-trick in a 6–2 home rout of Jerez Industrial CF on 10 January 2010.

On 1 February 2010, Angulo signed a -year deal with division two side CD Numancia after his contract was terminated at Écija. He made his debut three days later, playing the last 29 minutes in a 3–1 home win over UD Las Palmas.

Angulo rescinded his contract with the Rojillos on 22 July 2011, after starting sparingly during the campaign. He joined Real Unión hours later, scoring a career-best 13 goals in 2012–13, being team top scorer and being linked to a number of clubs also in the third division.

Abroad
On 5 August 2013, Angulo moved to the Cypriot First Division with Enosis Neon Paralimni FC. On 21 November, aged already 29, he scored his first professional goal, netting in a 3–1 home loss against AEL Limassol.

Angulo switched clubs and countries again on 14 September 2014, joining Football League (Greece)'s Apollon Smyrnis FC. He continued competing abroad in subsequent seasons, in the Super League Greece with Platanias F.C. and in the Polish I liga with Górnik Zabrze, being crowned top scorer for the latter team in 2016–17 as they returned to the Ekstraklasa as runners-up. His strong form continued in the top tier, as his 23 league strikes saw him end the campaign as the second highest goalscorer at the age of 34, while Górnik finished fourth and qualified for the first qualifying round of the UEFA Europa League (their first continental participation since 1994).

In 2018–19, Angulo finished as the league's top scorer with 24 goals from 37 appearances. On 22 July 2020, the 36-year-old agreed to a one-year contract at Indian Super League's FC Goa.

Angulo signed with ISL defending champions Mumbai City FC on 30 July 2021. In March 2022, he was included in the club's AFC Champions League squad.

International career
Angulo won seven caps for Spain at youth level, including two for the under-21s. He made his debut on 2 September 2004, starting and playing 68 minutes in a 3–1 win against Scotland in Alcoy.

Career statistics

Club

Honours
Individual
Greek Cup top scorer: 2014–15
Ekstraklasa top scorer: 2018–19
Ekstraklasa Forward of the Season: 2018–19
Indian Super League Golden Boot: 2020–21

References

External links

1984 births
Living people
Spanish footballers
Footballers from Bilbao
Association football wingers
Association football forwards
La Liga players
Segunda División players
Segunda División B players
Tercera División players
Danok Bat CF players
CD Basconia footballers
Bilbao Athletic footballers
Athletic Bilbao footballers
Gimnàstic de Tarragona footballers
Écija Balompié players
CD Numancia players
Real Unión footballers
Championnat National players
AS Cannes players
Cypriot First Division players
Enosis Neon Paralimni FC players
Super League Greece players
Football League (Greece) players
Apollon Smyrnis F.C. players
Platanias F.C. players
Ekstraklasa players
I liga players
Górnik Zabrze players
Indian Super League players
FC Goa players
Mumbai City FC players
Spain youth international footballers
Spain under-21 international footballers
Spanish expatriate footballers
Expatriate footballers in France
Expatriate footballers in Cyprus
Expatriate footballers in Greece
Expatriate footballers in Poland
Expatriate footballers in India
Spanish expatriate sportspeople in France
Spanish expatriate sportspeople in Cyprus
Spanish expatriate sportspeople in Greece
Spanish expatriate sportspeople in Poland
Spanish expatriate sportspeople in India